AVA Entertainment (AVA TV) is a Kurdish broadcasting station, based in Erbil, Kurdistan Region, Iraq. It started its broadcast on March 20, 2019, with television programs in the Kurdish dialects of Sorani and Kurmanci, as well as English. The channel is founded and owned by Mustafa Bayram.

Programming
AVA Entertainment is an art and entertainment channel transmitting worldwide from the Eutelsat 7 West A on 11354 Hz Vertical, SR 27500, FEC 3/4 and Eutelsat 7C East on 11689 Hz Vertical, SR 5040, FEC 4/5. The channel airs entertainment programs based on "Kurdish culture and values", and covers entertainment events in Iraq and Kurdistan Region. AVA Entertainment offers a radio broadcast in Kurdistan. AVA Entertainment's programs and series can be accessed digitally in other parts of the world through its website and mobile apps.

See also
 List of Kurdish-language television channels

References

External links
 

Television stations in Kurdistan Region (Iraq)
Kurdish-language television stations
Television channels and stations established in 2019
2019 establishments in Iraq
Kurdish culture